Yuriy Putrash (born 29 January 1990 in Mizhhirya, Zakarpattia Oblast, Ukrainian SSR) is a professional Ukrainian football defender who plays for FC Mynai.

International career 
He was called up to the Ukraine national under-20 football team for match against Iran-20 and made his debut on match 10 August 2010.

References

External links
 
 

1990 births
Living people
Ukrainian footballers
Ukrainian Premier League players
Ukrainian First League players
Ukrainian Second League players
FC Metalurh Donetsk players
FC Nyva Ternopil players
FC Obolon-Brovar Kyiv players
SC Tavriya Simferopol players
FC Chornomorets Odesa players
FC Stal Kamianske players
FC Oleksandriya players
Association football defenders
Ukrainian expatriate footballers
FC Akzhayik players
Expatriate footballers in Kazakhstan
Ukrainian expatriate sportspeople in Kazakhstan
FC Lviv players
FC Mynai players
Sportspeople from Zakarpattia Oblast